Patrick Joseph Dineen (born 13 May 1938) is a former Irish cricketer. A left-handed batsman, he made his debut for the Ireland cricket team in August 1962 against the Combined Services in a first-class match. He went on to play for Ireland on 23 occasions, his last match coming against the MCC at Lord's in July 1973.

Of his matches for Ireland, seven had first-class status. In all matches for Ireland, he scored 621 runs at an average of 19.41. His top score was 84 against Scotland in August 1968.

He also played one match for the MCC, against Scotland in July 1972.

References

1938 births
Living people
Irish cricketers
Sportspeople from Cork (city)